Ciaron Pilbeam is a British Formula One engineer. He is currently the chief race engineer at the Alpine Formula One team.

Career
Pilbeam first started at British American Racing working in Vehicle Dynamics. A year later, he worked closely with Jock Clear
as Assistant Race Engineer to 1997 Formula 1 world champion Jacques Villeneuve. Pilbeam continued working with BAR
as Race Engineer to Takuma Sato before moving to Red Bull Racing in 2006 with Christian Klien. In 2007, Pilbeam took on the role as Mark Webber's Race Engineer, keeping that position for six years. He assisted nine race wins for the Australian and contributed to three constructor world championship titles. He then joined Lotus F1 Team as Chief Race Engineer in 2013 and then joined McLaren the following year in an identical role. By 2017, Pilbeam returned to Enstone as Chief Race Engineer, working closely with Sporting Director Alan Permane and the engineering team.

References

Living people
British motorsport people
Formula One engineers
Year of birth missing (living people)